
Friedrich Köchling (22 June 1893 – 6 June 1970) was a German general in the Wehrmacht of Nazi Germany during World War II who held commands at the division and corps levels. He was also a recipient of the Knight's Cross of the Iron Cross.

Awards and decorations

 Knight's Cross of the Iron Cross on 31 July 1942 as Generalmajor and commander of 254. Infanterie-Division

References

Citations

Bibliography

 

1893 births
1970 deaths
People from Ahaus
German Army generals of World War II
Generals of Infantry (Wehrmacht)
German Army personnel of World War I
Recipients of the clasp to the Iron Cross, 1st class
Recipients of the Gold German Cross
Recipients of the Knight's Cross of the Iron Cross
German prisoners of war in World War II held by the United States
People from the Province of Westphalia
Reichswehr personnel
20th-century Freikorps personnel
Military personnel from North Rhine-Westphalia